Dorothy Nelson Neal OBE (1908–1982) was influential in the early days of women's athletics in Great Britain.

Neal was a high-ranking member of Birchfield Harriers athletics club for 53 years, and is recognised as one of the main and most respected characters in the club's history.

She competed as an athlete before taking up coaching and is recognised as the first female to coach a female athlete to a World Record, having been the coach of Diane Leather when she became the first women to run the mile in under five minutes.

Neal was an official at the 1948 Summer Olympics in London.

She was awarded the OBE for services to athletics, and a stand at Alexander Stadium is named after her.

References

1908 births
1982 deaths
British athletics coaches
British referees and umpires
Officers of the Order of the British Empire